Alfred Ollivant may refer to:

 Alfred Ollivant (bishop) (1798–1882), academic and bishop of Llandaff
 Alfred Ollivant (writer) (1874–1927), English novelist
 Alfred Ollivant (cricketer) (1839–1906), English cricketer

See also
 Ollivant (disambiguation)